This article lists the oldest known surviving buildings constructed in Australia.

17th Century

18th Century

19th Century

References 

Oldest
Australia